L'Enfant Plaza is an intermodal transit station complex located at L'Enfant Plaza in the Southwest Federal Center neighborhood of Washington, D.C. It consists of an underground Washington Metro rapid transit station and an elevated Virginia Railway Express commuter rail station.

The Metro station, which opened on July 1, 1977, is one of three major interchange stations on the Metro system. It serves five of the six Metro lines: the Green Line and Yellow Line with two side platforms on the upper level; and the Blue Line, Orange Line, and Silver Line with one island platform on the lower level.

The VRE station, which has a single side platform serving the northernmost of the three tracks of the RF&P Subdivision, is served by the Manassas Line and Fredericksburg Line.

History

Metro station
Orange Line service began on November 20, 1978 when the extension to  opened. The upper level opened with the opening of the Yellow Line on April 30, 1983; Green Line service began on May 11, 1991. Silver Line service on the lower level began on July 26, 2014. The Maryland Avenue entrance will be closed for about seven months beginning on May 9, 2022, for escalator replacement.

L'Enfant Plaza was the setting of a 2007 Pulitzer Prize–winning article by Washington Post reporter Gene Weingarten where world-famous classical violinist Joshua Bell performed outside the station at rush hour disguised as a street musician. On January 12, 2015, smoke appeared in the station during the afternoon rush hour, causing one death. A scene from the 2020 film Wonder Woman 1984 was filmed in the station in June 2018.

VRE station

The VRE station opened with the Manassas Line on June 22, 1992. The Fredericksburg Line began service on July 20, 1992. L'Enfant is the northern terminus of 40% of trips on VRE. A 2010 city report analyzed options to expand the station, including the potential extension of MARC service from Union Station to L'Enfant or Alexandria. VRE began planning for an expansion of the station in 2021. The existing side platform will be replaced with an island platform to allow for increased service, with a fourth track added.

Station layout 

The station complex is located the Southwest Federal Center area of Southwest, Washington, DC, centered around the intersection of 7th Street SW and D Street SW. The Metro station has three levels: a fare mezzanine, the Yellow/Green Line upper level with two side platforms, and the Orange/Blue/Silver Line lower level with one island platform. The north-south upper level stretches from C Street to E Street; the east-west lower level stretches from 9th Street to 6th Street. Metro entrances are located at the L'Enfant Plaza shopping mall concourse at 9th and D Streets, on D Street between 6th and 7th Streets, and at Maryland Avenue and 7th Street. Additional head houses may be eventually added.

The VRE platform is located on the north side of the three-track RF&P Subdivision, which is elevated above Virginia Avenue SW between 6th Street and 7th Street. Stairs lead to the station from 6th Street and 7th Street; a ramp leads to the station from C Street west of 7th Street. Most Amtrak intercity trains do not stop at L'Enfant, though several Northeast Regional trains stop for VRE passengers only as part of a ticket cross-honoring agreement.

References

External links

 VRE: L'Enfant
 Metro entrances on Google Maps Street View: D Street between 6th and 7th, Maryland Avenue and 7th Street, D Street and 9th Street
 VRE entrances on Google Maps Street View: 6th Street, 7th Street, C Street

Railway stations in Washington, D.C.
Stations on the Blue Line (Washington Metro)
Stations on the Green Line (Washington Metro)
Stations on the Orange Line (Washington Metro)
Stations on the Silver Line (Washington Metro)
Stations on the Yellow Line (Washington Metro)
Railway stations in the United States opened in 1977
L'Enfant
Washington Metro stations in Washington, D.C.
1977 establishments in Washington, D.C.
Articles containing video clips
Railway stations located underground in Washington, D.C.
Southwest Federal Center